The Anostomidae are a family of ray-finned fishes that belong to the order Characiformes. Closely related to the Chilodontidae and formerly included with them, the Anostomidae contain about 150 described species. Commonly known as anostomids, they are found in freshwater habitats from the Río Atrato in northernmost South America to warm-temperate central Argentina; they are of Amazon origin, with few found west of the Andes (mainly in Colombia and Venezuela). Their scientific name approximately means "mouth on top", from Ancient Greek áno- (ἄνω) "up" (as an adverb) + stóma (στόμᾶ) "mouth", in reference to the arrangement of these fishes' mouth opening.

Description
They have elongated, tapering heads with rather long, straight snouts, and small apical to upturned mouths immediately at or near the snout tip. This family contains many headstanders, which habitually swim with their heads pointing from 45° up to 90° downwards; most feed on plants near the bottom, while others also eat detritus and invertebrates picked up from river- or lakebeds. Adults guard the eggs after spawning. Anostomidae are generally considered edible, and some of the larger species are caught for food on a regular basis, much like large Leuciscinae (which are superficially similar Cypriniformes) are in the temperate Northern Hemisphere.

Their jaws are rather short, with the maxillary bone small and excluded from the mouth opening, while the ascending process of the premaxilla is triangular in overall shape and robustly developed. One row of six or eight curved teeth occur in each jaw, arranged by length in a step-like fashion, with the front teeth being the longest; the pharyngeal teeth are enlarged and have two or more cusps each.

Anostomid gill openings are small, with the gill membranes firmly joined to the isthmus; the ligament between the interopercle and the mouth is elongated and the interopercle is clearly separated from the retroarticular. On the sides of the preopercle is a large, elongated protrusion, where the powerful jaw adductor muscles attach. The third epibranchial gill arch has a curved anterior process which extends medially over the dorsal surface of the fourth infrapharyngobranchial arch. The circumorbital bone series is complete and includes a supraorbital bone, and at least four, often more, of the forward ribs are united by two or more intercostal ligaments.

The lateral line is complete, contains 33-44 perforated scales, and runs along the midline of the body. The dentary bears a short lateral-line canal ending at or shortly behind mid-length, and altogether the lateral-line canals of the head are divided into at least two ossified tubes. All anostomids have an adipose fin; their dorsal fin contains one and 11, the anal fin one and 9, and the pelvic fins one and 8-9 hard and soft rays, respectively.

Systematics and evolution

This family is in all probability monotypic as traditionally defined. Several attempts to delimit subfamilies have taken place, and several of the proposed groupings indeed correspond to clades within this family. Leporellus has long been recognized as the basal-most living anostomid genus, due to its many plesiomorphies shared with the Chilodontidae and its peculiar apomorphies, and separated as a monotypic subfamily by some. A large clade of "modern" genera was treated as Anostominae by some authors; others considered that subfamily more inclusive.

But the latter view is incorrect, as it includes a large number of lineages that are really basal members of the family and should not be treated as a subfamily (except monotypic ones, but these are generally avoided). Also, the huge assemblage usually treated under Leporinus is not monophyletic and in need of thorough study, to see how it is best divided. Depending on the exact relationships of Anostomoides, a Leporinus sensu lato clade could warrant recognition as another subfamily. Finally, Rhytiodus and Schizodon would almost certainly qualify as another subfamily, even if only the Anostominae warrant recognition otherwise.

Evolution and fossil record
The taxon Anostominae is also used to denote the entire family in outdated treatments, where the name "Anostomidae" is applied to the entire Anostomoidea (and sometimes even more distant relatives). In that respect, agreement is widespread  today that the closest living relatives of the Anostomidae sensu stricto are the Chilodontidae headstanders, the toothless characins (Curimatidae) and the flannel-mouthed characins (Prochilodontidae).

The origin of the Anostomidae can be quite confidently placed in the Paleogene, and somewhat less securely in late Paleogene, based on various evidence. For one, the biogeography of the family, with some very basal taxa found west of the Andes, indicates it was already well distinct when the northern part of that mountain range uplifted at the end of the Middle Miocene about 12 million years ago (Mya). Then, some scant but highly informative fossil evidence assigned to this family: a premaxillary tooth was found in the Colombian Villavieja Formation and dated to the Laventan age about 13.5-11.5 Mya, while some pharyngeal teeth and other jaw parts found near Cuenca, Ecuador in the Cuenca basin (a structural basin) are about 19 million years old. The fossil remains resemble Leporinus and were assigned to the living genus, but given its paraphyly and rather basal position, until more fossils are found the known remains can only be considered fairly basal Anostomidae, incertae sedis, but probably close to the Leporinus assemblage.

Cyphocharax mosesi, a fossil toothless characin found in Brazil, lived at the Oligocene-Miocene boundary about 23 Mya. Thus, at that time, the Anostomoidea families must have already been well distinct. Given that the Characiformes originated slightly more than 115 Mya, the Anostomoidea probably diverged from their characiform relatives the Late Cretaceous and diversified thereafter; a Paleogene origin of the Anostomidae is thus most likely, with present-day subfamilies (whatever eventually will be accepted) having diverged by the start of the Neogene. Whether the family originated in Oligocene or already in the Eocene (or perhaps even in the Paleocene) cannot be said until more fossil material is recovered, either to answer this question directly or to provide calibration for molecular phylogenetic studies.

Genera
The genera of Anostomidae are:

Basal lineages
 Abramites (two species)
 Anostomoides (three species)
 Hypomasticus (seven species)
 Leporellus (four species)
 Leporinus (79 species; paraphyletic)
 Megaleporinus (10 species)

Schizodon clade Rhytiodus (four species)
 Schizodon (16 species)Anostominae sensu stricto
 Anostomus (five species)
 Gnathodolus (one species)
 Laemolyta (9 species)
 Petulanos (three species)
 Pseudanos (four species; paraphyletic?)
 Sartor (three species)
 Synaptolaemus (two species)

In Brazil, many species of Leporinus, Rhytiodus, and Schizodon are called aracu.

References

Further reading

 Filleul, Arnaud & Maisey, John G. (2004): Redescription of Santanichthys diasii (Otophysi, Characiformes) from the Albian of the Santana Formation and comments on its implications for otophysan relationships. American Museum Novitates 3455: 1-21. PDF fulltext
 FishBase (2004): Family Anostomidae - Headstanders. Version of 2004-NOV-22. Retrieved 2009-FEB-26.
 Sidlauskas, Brian L. & Vari, Richard P. (2008): Phylogenetic relationships within the South American fish family Anostomidae (Teleostei, Ostariophysi, Characiformes). Zool. J. Linn. Soc. 154(1): 70–210.  (HTML abstract)
 Weitzman, S.H. & Vari, Richard P. (1998): [Anostomidae]. In: Paxton, J.R. & Eschmeyer, W.N. (eds.): Encyclopedia of Fishes: 104. Academic Press, San Diego. 

 
Fish of South America
Taxa named by Albert Günther